George L. Board (October 6, 1880 – January 5, 1962) was an American Negro league first baseman in the 1900s and 1910s.

A native of Shelby County, Kentucky, Board made his Negro leagues debut with the Indianapolis ABCs in 1907. He went on to play seven seasons with Indianapolis through 1913. Board died in Indianapolis, Indiana in 1962 at age 81.

References

External links
 and Seamheads

1880 births
1962 deaths
Indianapolis ABCs players
Baseball first basemen
Baseball players from Kentucky
People from Shelby County, Kentucky
20th-century African-American people